The Politics of Calabria, Italy takes place in a framework of a presidential representative democracy, whereby the President of Regional Government is the head of government, and of a pluriform multi-party system. Executive power is exercised by the Regional Government. Legislative power is vested in both the government and the Regional Council.

Executive branch

The Regional Government (Giunta Regionale) is presided by the President of the Region (Presidente della Regione), who is elected for a five-year term, and is composed by the President and the Ministers (Assessori), who are currently 11, including a Vice President (Vice Presidente).

List of presidents

Legislative branch

The Regional Council of Calabria (Consiglio Regionale della Calabria) is composed of 50 members. 40 councillors are elected in provincial constituencies by proportional representation using the largest remainder method with a Droop quota and open lists, while 10 councillors (elected in bloc) come from a "regional list", including the President-elect. One seat is reserved for the candidate who comes second. If a coalition wins more than 50% of the total seats in the Council with PR, only 5 candidates from the regional list will be chosen and the number of those elected in provincial constituencies will be 45. If the winning coalition receives less than 40% of votes, special seats are added to the Council to ensure a large majority for the President's coalition. Parties obtaining less than 4% receive no seats, no matter if they are in coalition with larger parties or not.

The Council is elected for a five-year term, but, if the President suffers a vote of no confidence, resigns or dies, under the simul stabunt, simul cadent clause introduced in 1999 (literally they will stand together or they will fall together), also the Council is dissolved and a snap election is called.

Local government

Provinces

Municipalities

Calabria is also divided in 404 comuni (municipalities), which have even more history, having been established in the Middle Ages when they were the main places of government.

Provincial capitals

Other municipalities with more than 20,000 inhabitants

Parties and elections

Latest regional election

In the latest regional election, which took place on 26 January 2020, Jole Santelli of Forza Italia was elected president by a landslide, after that in the previous election in 2014 the Democratic Party had won by a landslide.

References

External links
Calabria Region
Regional Council of Calabria
Constitution of Calabria

 

it:Calabria#Politica